The 2019 Preakness Stakes was the 144th running of the Preakness Stakes, the second leg of the American Triple Crown. It was held on May 18, 2019, at Pimlico Race Course in Baltimore, Maryland. The Preakness is a Grade I stakes race for three-year-old Thoroughbreds at a distance of  miles (1.9 km) with a record high purse of $1,650,000. The race was broadcast on NBC from 5:00 pm to 7:15 pm EDT with coverage of the undercard on NBCSN starting at 2:30 pm. The race was won by War of Will, who had finished seventh in the Kentucky Derby. The Maryland Jockey Club reported a total attendance of 131,256, the second highest attendance for American thoroughbred racing events in North America during 2019.

Field
The Preakness traditionally features the winner of the Kentucky Derby competing against other runners from that race as well as some "new shooters" – horses that either bypassed the Derby or did not qualify. However, Country House – the winner of the 2019 Kentucky Derby (by disqualification) – was withdrawn from consideration for the Preakness on May 7 when his trainer detected a virus; this marked the first time the Kentucky Derby winner did not race in the Preakness Stakes since 1996. Due to his absence, there was no possibility of a Triple Crown winner for 2019. The field also did not include Maximum Security, who crossed the finish line first in the Kentucky Derby but was disqualified for impeding other horses. His owner indicated that without a chance of winning the Triple Crown, he felt that the two week gap between the Derby and Preakness was too short.  In addition, Code of Honor and Tacitus, respectively the second- and third-place finishers in the Derby, skipped the Preakness. This meant that for the first time since 1951, the Preakness was missing the first four horses to cross the finish line in the Derby.

In their absence, thirteen horses were entered in the Preakness in what was considered a wide-open race. Contenders included:
 Improbable – fourth in the Derby, winner of the Los Alamitos Futurity, and second in the Rebel Stakes and Arkansas Derby
 War of Will – seventh in the Derby and winner of the Lecomte Stakes and Risen Star Stakes
 Win Win Win – ninth in the Kentucky Derby and second in the Blue Grass Stakes
 Bodexpress – thirteenth in the Derby and second in the Florida Derby
 Anothertwistafate – automatically qualified by winning the El Camino Real Derby
 Alwaysmining – automatically qualified by winning the Federico Tesio Stakes
 Laughing Fox – automatically qualified by winning the Oaklawn Stakes
 Signalman – winner of the Kentucky Jockey Club Stakes
 Owendale – winner of the Lexington Stakes
 Bourbon War – second in the Fountain of Youth Stakes

After the post position draw on May 15, Improbable was made the 5-2 morning-line favorite after also being the favorite in the Kentucky Derby.

Race description

At the start, Bodexpress dislodged his jockey, John R. Velazquez, who was not injured. Warrior's Charge set the pace, followed by Market King, Anothertwistafate, and War of Will. Warrior's Charge had the lead through three-quarters of a mile, then started to fade at the top of the stretch. War of Will, on the rail, then took the lead, winning by  lengths. Everfast came from 11th place to finish in second by a nose, edging out Owendale who came from ninth to finish in third. Warrior's Charge finished fourth. Improbable, the favorite, finished sixth.

Bodexpress, who ran the entire course without his rider—officially a "did not finish"—captured public attention, with his name trending on Twitter. He was finally caught and brought under control by an outrider after the race.

Records
Although the attendance was 2.4% less than 2018, wagering of $99,852,653 on the Preakness fourteen race card set a new record.

Results

 Bodexpress dislodged his jockey at the start.

 Winning owner: Gary Barber
 Winning breeder: Flaxman Holdings Limited
 Track: Fast

Times:  mile – 0:22.50;   mile – 0:46.16;  mile – 1:10.56; mile – 1:35.48;  final – 1:54.34.
Splits for each quarter-mile: (:23.66) (:24.40) (:24.23) (:24.92) (:18.86 for final )

Reference: Equibase Chart

Payout

The 144th Preakness payout schedule

 $2 Exacta (1–10) $947.00
 $1 Trifecta (1–10–5) $4,699.80
 $1 Superfecta (1–10–5–3) $51,924.00
 $1 Super High Five (1–10–5–3–11) no winner—$404,310 carryover

References

External links
 
 Race replay from NBC Sports via YouTube

2019
2019 in horse racing
May 2019 sports events in the United States
Horse races in Maryland
2019 in sports in Maryland